Khongjom War Memorial Complex is a war memorial commemorating the Anglo-Manipur War. Situated at Khongjom, Thoubal district of Manipur, the complex houses the world's tallest sword statue.

See also
 Maibam Lokpa Ching

References

Buildings and structures in Manipur
History of Manipur
Tourist attractions in Manipur